As a publicity stunt, the express train called the Transcontinental Express arrived in San Francisco, California, via the First transcontinental railroad on 4 June 1876, only 83 hours and 39 minutes after having left New York City. The feat was reported widely in U.S. newspapers.

References

"Completing the Transcontinental Railroad, 1869" EyeWitness to History, w  (2004)

Passenger rail transportation in the United States
Union Pacific Railroad
1876 in rail transport